Shahrak-e Balal (also Romanized as Shahrak-e Balāl) is a village in Julaki Rural District, Jayezan District, Omidiyeh County, Khuzestan Province, Iran. At the 2006 census, its population was 706, in 110 families.

References 

Populated places in Omidiyeh County